The Green Glove (aka The White Road) is a 1952 French/American international co-production film noir directed by Rudolph Maté and starring Glenn Ford, Geraldine Brooks, Sir Cedric Hardwicke and George Macready.

Plot
Church bells begin to ring and the parish priest (Sir Cedric Hardwicke) knows it means only one thing.  The 'green glove,' a miraculous gem-studded gauntlet, the churches' holy relic, has returned to St. Elizar.  The town folk pour into the abbey to rejoice.

Mike Blake (Glenn Ford) is an American paratrooper who travels to France after the end of World War II to try to recover the jewel-encrusted glove that had been stolen from a country church during the war.  His quest leads him to a beautiful young tour guide in Paris named Chris (Geraldine Brooks).  A man who has been mysteriously following Mike is found dead in Mike's hotel room.   The man has a sketch drawing of Mike in his pocket.  Mike tells the police he does not know the man and he is innocent.  Chris has fallen for Mike and joins him when he did not ask for her help.

Count Paul Rona (George Macready) is a Nazi collaborator and art dealer and is searching for the glove to sell it.  Mike and the Count had a run-in near the end of the war.  A French Resistance Countess helped Mike escape and as a thank you he left her his valise.  Despite being followed by the police and Rona's henchmen, Mike and Chris retrieve the glove in Monte Carlo.  It was in the valise.  The countess kisses the glove and her madness is lifted.

Mike takes the jeweled gauntlet back to the church as he is pursued by Count Rona. The mountain chase was dark and dangerous.  Chris diverts the police inspector.  Mike shoots and kills Rona in the bell tower, he rings the bells, and lastly he returns the glove to its rightful place on the altar.  The French police clear Mike.  Mike and Chris embrace and kiss.

Cast
 Glenn Ford as Michael 'Mike' Blake
 Geraldine Brooks as Christine 'Chris' Kenneth
 Sir Cedric Hardwicke as Father Goron
 George Macready as Count Paul Rona
 Gaby André as Gaby Saunders
 Jany Holt as The Countess
 Roger Tréville as Police Insp. Faubert
 Georges Tabet as Jacques Piotet
 Meg Lemonnier as Madame Piotet
 Paul Bonifas as Inspector
 Jean Bretonnière as Singer

Background
The movie was shot mostly on location in southern France and Monaco. It was based on actions that took place during Operation Dragoon.

Soundtrack
L'Amour est parti 
Written by Joseph Kosma
Lyrics by Henri Bassis
Sung by Juliette Gréco

Romance
Written by Joseph Kosma
Lyrics by Henri Bassis
Sung by Juliette Gréco

Reception

Critical response
When the film was first released in 1952, film critic Bosley Crowther expected a first-rate production given that, the screenplay writer,  Charles Bennett, had written films "of a high order" such as The 39 Steps. However, he found The Green Glove "is not in that echelon, but is merely a standard chase after a medieval, bejewelled gauntlet filched from a rural French church." He continued, "... but the tale spun is minor-league melodrama. Glenn Ford is largely listless as the paratrooper who clashed with a collaborator-art dealer during the war ..."

Film critic Dennis Schwartz was disappointed in the film, yet praised the work of Glenn Ford.  He wrote, "Rudolph Maté (D.O.A./Union Station/Miracle in the Rain) directs this standard thriller, that has a few twists but bogs down over too many hysterical melodramatic moments and the unbelievability of the characters and story line. It's weakly scripted by Charles Bennett and is based on his novel ... There's a good story here, but too bad it wasn't told convincingly and the featured sudden romance came about so quickly that it was not possible for me to believe it; nor was I able to find the suspense story even close to the way a top-notch director like Hitchcock would have built up the suspense and made things more exciting (If not convinced then perhaps check out The 39 Steps, directed by Hitchcock and also written by Bennett!). The former cinematographer Maté can't keep things real and all the plot points seem nothing short of schematic. But Glenn Ford is in it, and he's so good in these type of adventure roles that he at least keeps the flawed pic entertaining."

Comic book adaptation
 Eastern Color Movie Love #15 (June 1952)

See also
 List of films in the public domain in the United States

References

External links
 
 
 
 
 
 
  (public domain)

1952 films
1950s thriller drama films
American thriller drama films
English-language French films
French thriller drama films
Films directed by Rudolph Maté
Film noir
Films shot in Monaco
Films shot in France
Films set in France
Films adapted into comics
1952 drama films
American black-and-white films
Films scored by Joseph Kosma
1950s English-language films
1950s American films
1950s French films